The Gentleman from Louisiana is a 1936 American drama film directed by Irving Pichel and written by Joseph Fields and Gordon Rigby. The film stars Eddie Quillan, Charles "Chic" Sale, Charlotte Henry, John Miljan, Marjorie Gateson and Pierre Watkin. The film was released on August 15, 1936, by Republic Pictures.

Plot

Cast
Eddie Quillan as Tod Mason
Charles "Chic" Sale as Deacon Devlin
Charlotte Henry as Linda Costigan
John Miljan as Baltimore
Marjorie Gateson as Fay Costigan
Pierre Watkin as Roger Leland
Charles C. Wilson as Diamond Jim Brady
Holmes Herbert as Chief Steward
Matt McHugh as Steve Brodie
Snub Pollard as Hadley	
Gertrude Hoffman as Miss Langley
Harrison Greene as Auctioneer
Ruth Gillette as Lillian Russell
 John Kelly as John L. Sullivan
Arthur Wanzer as Moran
Kenneth Lawton as Brady's Butler
Lowden Adams as Fairfield's Butler

References

External links
 

1936 films
American drama films
1936 drama films
Republic Pictures films
Films directed by Irving Pichel
American black-and-white films
Films produced by Nat Levine
1930s English-language films
1930s American films